Contos is a surname of Greek origin. Notable people with the surname include:

Adam Contos, CEO of RE/MAX
Theresa Contos (born 1959), American former handball player
Chanel Contos, Australian sexual assault activist

References

Surnames of Greek origin